The royal parrotfinch (Erythrura regia) is a species of estrildid finch endemic to Vanuatu in the South Pacific Ocean. It is found commonly at mid-altitudes on the larger islands such as Espiritu Santo, above 300 m., but it also can be found at small sea-level islands in fruiting figs in forest edge in Emae and Tongoa. This species is usually found in singles, pairs or small groups feeding on figs in the forest canopy. Clements has lumped this bird into the red-headed parrotfinch.

Identification
The royal parrotfinch is approximately 11 cm long. This species is a multicoloured finch. Male royal parrotfinches have a bright red head and tail, blue breast and turquoise-green upperparts, while females are greener in colour. Young royal parrotfinches are duller with a dull blue head. This species has a high, thin voice and trilling song.

Threats
This species is threatened by commercial logging which has removed its natural habitat. There are also reports of small-scale cage-bird trade of royal parrotfinchs. The IUCN has classified the species as being vulnerable.

Conservation measures
It was suggested to implement a captive conservation breeding programme on Lake Letas Reserve, Gaua. It was also proposed to investigate any cage-bird trade, especially on Tongoa and Emae. The suggestion was to reduce commercial logging to conserve forest reserves, supporting the natural habitat of Lake Letas Reserve.

References

External links
Species factsheet - BirdLife International

royal parrotfinch
Birds of Vanuatu
Endemic fauna of Vanuatu
royal parrotfinch
royal parrotfinch
Taxobox binomials not recognized by IUCN